Tolimán may refer to:

Tolimán (Jalisco), a town in the Mexican state of Jalisco.
Tolimán (Querétaro), a town in the Mexican state of Querétaro.
Volcán Tolimán, a stratovolcano in Guatemala.